Black Labyrinth is the debut solo studio album by American vocalist Jonathan Davis (best known as the frontman of nu metal band Korn). The album was released on May 25, 2018, through Sumerian Records.

The first single, "What It Is", was released on January 26, 2018 as part of the soundtrack to the movie American Satan.

Background
Jonathan Davis had hinted at a solo album for a number of years, first working without his bandmates in Korn when he collaborated on the Queen of the Damned soundtrack. Word of a full solo album began to circulate in the mid-2000s when Davis began touring and writing with his solo band, Jonathan Davis and the SFA, with whom he released two live albums, Alone I Play (2007) and Live at the Union Chapel (2011). The SFA was disbanded after the death of guitarist Shane Gibson. Over the next decade, Davis would continue to write solo material while performing with Korn, and in January 2018 announced a North American and European tour in support of a new album that would come out later in the year. That same month, he released the song What It Is.

In March 2018, Sumerian Records revealed an official teaser for the album, which revealed the title, artwork and release date, along with snippets of each track on the album. While a full list of musicians has yet to be officially released, it has been confirmed that Ray Luzier, Wes Borland, Miles Mosley, Mike Dillon and Shenkar have all made appearances on the album.

Critical reception
"Black Labyrinth" received generally favorable reviews from critics. At Metacritic, which assigns a normalized rating out of 100 to reviews from mainstream publications, the album received an average score of 64 based on 5 reviews.

Track listing

Personnel

Musicians
Jonathan Davis – vocals, guitar, keyboards, programming, violin, sitar, production
Wes Borland – guitars (tracks 2, 5, 8, 10, 13)
Miles Mosley – bass guitar (tracks 2-8, 10, 12)
Zac Baird – keyboards (tracks 1–3, 7-10, 13), programming (tracks 4, 9)
Ray Luzier – drums (tracks 1, 3–8, 10, 13)
Mike Dillon – percussion (track 2), tablas (track 8, 12)
Shenkar – violin, additional vocals (tracks 2, 8, 13)
Djivan Gasparyan – duduk (track 2)
Byron Katie – sample (track 11)

Production
Jim Monti – recording
Tiago Nunez – additional production
Josh Wilbur – mixing
Kyle McAulay – mixing assistance
Vlado Meller – mastering
David Stoupakis – artwork
Daniel McBride – logo
Carly Sarno – logo
Jonathan Weiner – photography

Charts

References

2018 debut albums
Jonathan Davis albums
Sumerian Records albums